Irianassa is a genus of moths belonging to the family Tortricidae.

Species
Irianassa aetheria (Turner, 1946)
Irianassa poecilaspis Meyrick, 1923
Irianassa sapphiropa Meyrick, 1905 (from Sri Lanka)
Irianassa speciosana (Pagenstecher, 1900)
Irianassa uranopa Meyrick, 1927

See also

List of Tortricidae genera

References
Genus description: Meyrick, 1905, Descriptions of Indian Micro-Lepidoptera.I. - Journal of the Bombay natural History Society 16(4):580–619.

External links
tortricidae.com

]

Tortricidae genera
Olethreutinae
Taxa named by Edward Meyrick